Théodore Aubert (8 September 1878, Geneva – 19 January 1963) was a Swiss lawyer and writer.

Biography 
As a lawyer, he defended the White émigré Maurice Conradi who assassinated the Soviet envoy to Switzerland Vatslav Vorovsky in 1923. Aubert founded the International Entente Against the Third International in 1924.

External links 
Aubert, Théodore at the Historical Dictionary of Switzerland 

1878 births
1963 deaths
Writers from Geneva
Swiss Calvinist and Reformed Christians
Members of the National Council (Switzerland)
Lawyers from Geneva